Madison Charter Township is a charter township of Lenawee County in the U.S. state of Michigan.  The population was 8,621 at the 2010 census.

Communities
Gorman was an unincorporated community in this township. It had a post office from 1893 until 1902.
The ZIP code is 49279. The area is served by Sand Creek Community Schools. The Sand Creek Aggies are members of the Tri-County Conference.

Geography

Demographics
As of the census of 2000, there were 8,200 people, 2,191 households, and 1,676 families residing in the township. The racial makeup of the township was 81.63% White, 13.05% African American, 0.27% Native American, 0.35% Asian, 3.33% from other races, and 1.37% from two or more races. Hispanic or Latino of any race were 7.35% of the population.

There were 2,191 households, out of which 34.7% had children under the age of 18 living with them, 61.5% were married couples living together, 11.1% had a female householder with no husband present, and 23.5% were non-families. 19.5% of all households were made up of individuals, and 7.7% had someone living alone who was 65 years of age or older.  The average household size was 2.70 and the average family size was 3.07.

In the township the population was spread out, with 20.3% under the age of 18, 8.6% from 18 to 24, 38.4% from 25 to 44, 22.6% from 45 to 64, and 10.2% who were 65 years of age or older.  The median age was 36 years. For every 100 females, there were 165.8 males.  For every 100 females age 18 and over, there were 185.8 males.

The median income for a household in the township was $47,114, and the median income for a family was $52,642. Males had a median income of $33,941 versus $23,103 for females. The per capita income for the township was $17,749.  About 1.0% of families and 2.1% of the population were below the poverty line, including 2.1% of those under age 18 and 3.1% of those age 65 or over.

References

External links
Lenawee County government site
Complete text of History of Lenawee County published in 1909 by the Western Historical Society

Townships in Lenawee County, Michigan
Charter townships in Michigan
1834 establishments in Michigan Territory
Populated places established in 1834